This is a list of sport leagues designated A1. The entries are sorted by sport and by countries.

Sports 
Baseball
 A1 baseball league (Italy)
 Class A1 (baseball), a defunct classification within Minor League Baseball

Basketball
 A1 basketball league (Albania), the first professional league 
 A1 basketball league (Bosnia and Herzegovina)
 A1 basketball league (Bulgaria), the second professional league
 A1 basketball league (Croatia)
 A1 basketball league (Greece)

Inline Hockey
 A1 inline hockey league (Italy), a league composed of eleven professional teams 

Volleyball
 A1 volleyball league (Greece)
 A1 volleyball league (Italy)
 A1 volleyball league (Portugal)
 A1 women's volleyball league (Portugal)
Water polo
 A1 water polo league (Greece)